Jangarek-e Pain (also Romanized as Jangārek-e Pā’īn; also known as Jangārk) is a village in Pir Sohrab Rural District, in the Central District of Chabahar County, Sistan and Baluchestan Province, Iran. At the 2006 census, its population was 139, in 26 families.

References 

Populated places in Chabahar County